Kinathukadavu (also spelt as Kinathukkadavu), meaning Pass of the Well, is a town panchayat suburb of Coimbatore city and taluk in Coimbatore district in the Indian state of Tamil Nadu.

Geography

Demographics
As of 2011 Indian Census, Kinathukadavu had a total population of 8,653, of which 4,271 were males and 4,382 were females. Population within the age group of 0 to 6 years was 737. The total number of literates in Kinathukadavu was 6,565, which constituted 75.9% of the population with male literacy of 81.3% and female literacy of 70.5%. The effective literacy rate of 7+ population of Kinathukadavu was 82.9%, of which male literacy rate was 89.3% and female literacy rate was 76.8%. The Scheduled Castes and Scheduled Tribes population was 1,263 and 4 respectively. Kinathukadavu had 2,469 households in the year 2011.

Education

Colleges
 Akshaya College of Engineering and Technology.

Places of interest
 Eachanari Vinayagar Temple

Climate
Kinathukadavu is located about 40 km east of the Palghat Pass in the Western Ghats. Winds from the Arabian sea are funnelled via the Palghat  Pass resulting in a salubrious climate. During southwest monsoon, the place receives heavy rainfall. It has a moderate temperature and windy climate during summer period.  The important crops which are cultivated, are vegetables like tomato, green chilly, lady's finger, brinjal, cotton, ground nuts etc. Coconut trees are also well suitable for this soil and climate conditions.
One of the famous landmarks and places to gather is on the pollachi main road.

Culture
The town has a multi-ethnic, multi-religions population. Hindus, Muslims, Christians are the major religions in Kinathukadavu. Gowdas are the majority community people living here as it comes under kongu region.

Transport
Buses from Ukkadam Bus Terminal to Pollachi stop here. TNSTC buses and private buses are also available to Kinathukadavu. Town Bus numbered 33A connects Kinathikadavu with Gandhipuram Bus terminal.
Busses available for every 5 mins. from Pollachi and Ukkadam bus terminal. It has a railway station and has rail services from Coimbatore. Kinathukadavu Junction serves intermediate stop between Coimbatore and Pollachi Junctions.

Workforce 
People are involved mainly in agricultural activity.  Rest of people are working in Textile industry, Automobile Industries.  Small Scale Industries Development Corporation (SIDCO) also is located very near from Kinathukadavu.
 Many MNC companies and Indian companies are established around Kinathukadavu.
 Nearly 30 companies are around Kinathukadavu.
 Eppinger tooling Asia pvt. ltd. is a German MNC located in Kinathukadavu.
 The windy climate has attracted the setting up of a number of wind mills to the east of Kinathukadavu.

Politics
Kinathukadavu assembly constituency is a part of Pollachi (Lok Sabha constituency).
Kinathukadavu is represented by its own Member of Legislative Assembly. It is one of the 234 Assembly constituencies in Tamil Nadu. Kinathukadavu Legislative Assembly Constituency number is 122.

References

External links
 Kinathukadavu - Town Panchayat

Cities and towns in Coimbatore district